Debra Evans (born 1953) is an American writer known for her books on issues related to contemporary Christian spirituality, reproductive health, women's wellness, and family relationships. She has written over 22 non-fiction books.

Biography
She was born to John Cleve Munger and Nancy Allen Munger at St. Joseph Hospital, Pontiac, Michigan. In 1968, Evans created and edited an alternative newspaper, The Zeitgeist, and poetry magazine, Cinnamon Crust. Shortly after completing studies at Royal Oak's Kimball High School in 1969, Evans entered Justin Morrill College at Michigan State University as an Art and English major. She met David Evans in 1969 and married him in 1970. Following David's graduation in 1970 from MSU, the couple returned to Oakland County.

While studying at Wayne State University in early 1971, she embraced faith in Jesus Christ. Between 1971 and 1974, Evans and her husband founded and managed Predmore Farm, a residential Christian community located in Oakland Charter Township, now the centennial site of Cranberry Lake Farm, a  park where members of the Detroit Symphony Orchestra perform an annual summer concert.  After giving birth to her first child at home on the farm in 1972, Evans became a childbirth educator and breastfeeding advisor, later working as one of the nation’s first paid lactation consultants through her employment with Dr. David Gustafson at William Beaumont Hospital in Royal Oak.

Until her retirement from the field in 2003, she remained involved in health education and midwifery advocacy. Evans taught classes as a part-time instructor at Lansing Community College (1978–1981) and the University of Nebraska-Lincoln (1984–1988). She also served in Michigan as state coordinator of the International Childbirth Education Association (1979–1981) and member of the Department of Health’s Task Force on Perinatal Education (1980–1981); in Nebraska as member of the Lincoln-Lancaster Health Department Task Force on Children and Youth, Teen Pregnancy Subcommittee (1983–1984) and the State of Nebraska Breastfeeding Promotion Task Force (1988–1990); in Georgia as member of the DeKalb County Disabilities Council (1991–1993) and president of Atlanta Bethany Christian Services (1991–1993); and in Texas as board member and chair of the State of Texas Midwifery Board (1998–2003). As a founding board member of the Firelight Foundation, Evans also advocated for the needs of children affected by HIV/AIDS in Sub-Saharan Africa.

In 1978, she developed and taught Parents Preparing in Christ (PPC), a class series for expectant Christian couples in Michigan (1978–1981) and Nebraska (1982–1990). Immediately after her graduation in 1983 from the University of Nebraska-Lincoln (BA, University Studies in Family Wellness and Reproductive Health), Evans wrote her first non-fiction book, The Complete Guide to Childbirth, based on her research for the PPC curriculum. Following the book’s publication in 1986, she has continued to author many additional works, including Beauty and the Best, Kindred Hearts,  Blessing Your Husband, and Blessing Your Grown Children.

In 1988 and 1989, Evans was a finalist for the Evangelical Christian Publishers Association (ECPA) Gold Medallion Awards in the Marriage and Family (The Mystery of Womanhood) and Inspirational (Fragrant Offerings) categories, as well as for Christianity Today’s 1990 Critics’ Choice and Reader’s Choice Awards (Without Moral Limits). Reviews of her books have appeared in The Annals of Pharmacotherapy, The Austin American Statesman, Christian Herald, First Things, The Lincoln Journal, Marriage & Family Living, Publishers Weekly, Religion & Society, Southwestern Journal of Theology, The Atlanta Journal-Constitution, and Today’s Christian Woman. From 1989-1996, Evans served as contributing editor of Christian Parenting Today.

Since 1986, Evans has appeared as a featured guest on over five hundred radio and television interviews. Her participation in the panel discussion on reproductive technology and embryonic stem cell research (taped on March 7, 1990 by Family Christian Broadcasting Network–KFCB, Concord, California) was awarded the 1990 Angel Award for Best Network Documentary.

Her seventh book, Without Moral Limits, resulted in invitations for Evans to serve as a member of the Colloquium on Medical Ethics held at Trinity Evangelical Divinity School (1989) and the Christianity Today Institute Forum on Birth Control (1991), with subsequent statements and articles published in the New England Journal of Medicine (1990) and Christianity Today (1991). She was a signatory of the statement, “On human embryos and medical research: an appeal for ethically responsible science and public policy."

Evans relocated to Texas in 1993, where she resides with her husband in Austin. Since completing her latest book, she continues to serve and support her local church community as a mentor, leader, and prayer partner.

Works
Non-fiction
Blessing Your Grown Children: Affirming, Helping, and Establishing Boundaries (2012)  
Blessing Your Husband: Understanding and Affirming Your Man (2009)  
Blessing Your Husband (2003) 
Soul Satisfaction (2001) 
Without Moral Limits: Women, Reproduction, and Medical Technology (2000) 
The Christian Woman’s Guide to Childbirth (1999)  
Women of Courage (1999) 
The Christian Woman’s Guide to Personal Healthcare (1998) 
Women of Character (1997) 
Ready or Not, You’re a Grandparent (1997) 
The Christian Woman’s Guide to Sexuality (1997) 
Kindred Hearts (1997) 
Six Qualities of Women of Character (1996) 
Beauty and the Best (1993) 
The Woman’s Complete Guide to Personal Health Care (1991) 
Blessed Events (1990) 
Without Moral Limits (1989) 
Preparing for Childbirth (1989) 
Fragrant Offerings (1988) 
Beauty for Ashes (1988) 
Heart & Home (1988) 
The Mystery of Womanhood (1987) 
The Complete Book on Childbirth (1986) 

Audiobook
Read by Debra Evans: Six Qualities of Women of Character (1996) 

General editor
Christian Parenting Answers: Before Birth to Five Years (1994) 

Books contributed to
Evans has also contributed chapters to several books, including:
Beyond Today (2000), edited by John MacArthur 
Breakfast for the Soul (1998) compiled by Judith Couchman  
One Holy Passion (1998) compiled by Judith Couchman 
Christian Parenting Answers: Before Birth to Five Years (1994)

References

Articles by Evans
 Friendship in Marriage
 When to Wean
 Sex Ed at Home
 Building Friendship in Marriage
 Your Child Today: Birth to Twelve Months

External links
Official Website
 Tyndale House Publishers
 Crossway Books
 Cranberry Lake Farm
 Firelight Foundation

1953 births
American non-fiction writers
American religious writers
Women religious writers
Christian writers
American family and parenting writers
American health and wellness writers
American women non-fiction writers
American medical writers
Women medical writers
American self-help writers
Writers from Michigan
Living people
21st-century American women